Bayshore Beautiful is a neighborhood within the city limits of Tampa, Florida, United States. As of the 2010 census, its population was 5,931. The ZIP Codes serving the area are 33611 and 33629.

Geography
Bayshore Beautiful boundaries are El Prado Boulevard to the north, Virginia Park to the west, Ballast Point to the southeast, Sun Bay South to the southwest, and Bayshore Boulevard to the east.

Demographics
Source: Hillsborough County Atlas

At the 2010 census there were 5,931 people and 2,601 households residing in the neighborhood. The population density was 6,156/mi2. The racial makeup of the neighborhood was 92% White, 2% African American, less than 1% Native American, 2% Asian, and 2% from two or more races. Hispanic or Latino of any race were about 11%.

Of the 2,601 households 25% had children under the age of 18 living with them, 49% were married couples living together, 6% had a female householder with no husband present, and 8% non-families. 33% of households were made up of individuals.

The age distribution was 21% under the age of 18, 16% from 18 to 34, 26% from 35 to 49, 21% from 50 to 64, and 16% 65 or older. For every 100 females, there were 96.4 males.

The per capita income for the neighborhood was $45,047. About 5% of the population were below the poverty line. Of those, 9% are under age 18.

Dining and shopping
Between Bayview and Wallcraft Avenues on MacDill Avenue, there is a small district of bars, cafes and shops. This area is considered part of the expanded definition of the Palma Ceia Design District even though it is outside of Palma Ceia's boundaries.

See also
Hyde Park
Neighborhoods in Tampa, Florida
Palma Ceia

References

External links
Bayshore Beautiful Civic Association
Bayshore Beautiful from Neighborhood Link
Bayshore Beautiful Neighborhood Association

Neighborhoods in Tampa, Florida
Populated places on Tampa Bay